The 2008 ADAC Formel Masters season was the first season of the open wheel racing series from Germany. The ADAC Formel Masters is a new continental series for junior drivers powered by Volkswagen, a 1.6-litre FSI engine delivering  will power the single-seaters made by the Italian manufacturer Dallara.

The season started on May 9, 2008, at the Oschersleben and ended on October 26 at Hockenheim with the win of the Portuguese driver Armando Parente.

Teams and drivers
 All cars are powered by Volkswagen engines, and Dallara Formulino chassis.

Race calendar and results

Championship standings

Drivers'

Teams'

References

External links
 Official Website 
 ADAC Masters Weekend 

ADAC Formel Masters
ADAC Formel Masters seasons
ADAC Formel Masters